Alfred Grosser (born 1 February 1925 in Frankfurt am Main) is a German-French writer, sociologist, and political scientist. He is known for his contributions towards the Franco-German cooperation after World War II and for criticizing Israel.

Early life
His father, Paul Grosser, was born in 1880 in Berlin and died 1934 in Saint-Germain-en-Laye, France. A director of a children's hospital in Frankfurt am Main, socialist, freemason, and Jew, he was forced to immigrate to France in 1933 due to the increasing antisemitism in Nazi Germany. Alfred and his mother, Lily Grosser, were given French citizenship through a decree by the Minister of Justice, Vincent Auriol, in 1937; as a result, they were spared possible internment in a French camp following France's declaration of war on Germany, in September 1939, when, under the government of Daladier, German refugees from Nazism were treated as enemy aliens, along with other German residents.

Career

Alfred studied political science and the German language. After 1955, he became a professor at the Institut d'études politiques de Paris. In 1965, Grosser began contributing to many newspapers and broadcasts, including La Croix and Ouest-France. He was very involved in improving the Franco-German cooperation, and paved the road for the Élysée Treaty in 1963.  In 1992, he retired as the Director of Studies and Research at the Fondation Nationale des Sciences Politiques.

Political opinions
Grosser opposed many Israeli government policies, as well as parts of the French government. When asked to describe the way his statements are received, he referred to the "moral cudgel" (Moralkeule), a phrase coined by writer Martin Walser. In 1998, when one of Walser's speeches created huge controversy, Grosser publicly sided with Walser.

Grosser also holds to the opinion that Israel's politics inherently invoke anti-semitism. In 2003, Grosser left the board of magazine L’Express because he believed its reporting on the Middle East was unbalanced. He stated that the editor had reluctantly published his positive critique on a book that criticized Israel, while later printing multiple readers' letters attacking Grosser.

Alfred Grosser criticized awarding the Ludwig Börne Prize 2007 to Henryk M. Broder through Focus publisher Helmut Markwort, feeling that both were neither worthy of the prize nor the handing in the Paulskirche.<ref>[http://www.taz.de/1/archiv/archiv/?dig=2007/02/03/a0193 Beleidigung des Humanismus Falsche Wahl: Henryk M. Broder hat den Börne-Preis nicht verdient], die tageszeitung, 3. Februar 2007</ref>

Grosser was invited by the city of Frankfurt to give the main speech at a Kristallnacht commemorative meeting on 9 November 2010 in the Paulskirche. Mayor Roth was criticized for inviting him by members of the Central Council of Jews in Germany and others, but she stood by her invitation.http://www.jpost.com/International/Article.aspx?id=194291 JPost They threatened to walk out should Grosser "fail regarding Israel". In the end, the speech was delivered without disturbance.http://thelede.blogs.nytimes.com/2010/11/08/jewish-critic-of-israel-chosen-to-speak-at-frankfurts-kristallnacht-commemoration/?hp NYT, 8–9 Nov 2010

Selected publicationsDeutschlandbilanz. Geschichte Deutschlands seit 1945, 1970 (Germany in Our Time- a Political History of the Postwar Years, 1974)Das Bündnis, 1981Versuchte Beeinflussung, 1981Der schmale Grat der Freiheit, 1981
 Western Alliance V815 (1982, from French)Das Deutschland im Westen, Carl Hanser Verlag, München 1985, Frankreich und seine Außenpolitik, 1986Mit Deutschen streiten, 1987Mein Deutschland, 1993Deutschland in Europa, 1998Was ich denke., November 2000Wie anders sind die Deutschen?, 2002Wie anders ist Frankreich, 2005Die Früchte ihres Baumes. Ein atheistischer Blick auf die Christen, September 2005Der Begriff Rache ist mir völlig fremd in: Martin Doerry (editor): Nirgendwo und überall zu Haus. Gespräche mit Überlebenden des Holocaust (Deutsche Verlags-Anstalt), München 2006  (also on CD) pp. 120 – 129Die Frage nach der Leitkultur in: Robertson-von Trotha, Caroline Y. (ed.): Kultur und Gerechtigkeit (= Kulturwissenschaft interdisziplinär/Interdisciplinary Studies on Culture and Society, Vol. 2), Baden-Baden 2007, Von Auschwitz nach Jerusalem (Über Deutschland und Israel), Rowohlt-Verlag 2009, 

Honours

 1975: Friedenspreis des Deutschen Buchhandels, for his role as "middle man between French and Germans, non-believers and believers, Europeans and people from other continents"; this gave him an earlier opportunity to speak in the Paulskirche.
 1978: Theodor-Heuss-Prize
 1995: Cicero Redner Prize for Rhetoric
 1996: Schiller Prize of the City of Mannheim
 1998: Grand Prix de l'Académie des Sciences morales et politiques
 2004: Abraham Geiger-Prize of Abraham-Geiger-Kolleg, University of Potsdam
 Grand Cross, Order of Merit of the Federal Republic of Germany
 Grand Officier de la Légion d'Honneur

Interviews
Israels Politik fördert den Antisemitismus Martina Doering interviews Alfred Grosser, Berliner Zeitung, 15 August 2006. German
Ich muss als Jude nicht für Israel sein Interview by Stefan Reinecke and Daniel Bax with Alfred Grosser in Die Tageszeitung, 4 April 2007. German
Sofort heißt es: Antisemitismus! Tobias Kaufman interviews Alfred Grosser, following  his new book "Von Auschwitz nach Jerusalem" (From Auschwitz to Jerusalem), 18 September 2009. German
 "Ich bin genetisch optimistisch": Talk about "Von Auschwitz nach Jerusalem" with Moritz Reininghaus, Die Tageszeitung 28 September 2009. German
I have always wanted Europe": Interview by Euronews (12 May 2010; retrieved 13 November 2010). English
TV-interview, 4 November 2010 about his upcoming speech in the Paulskirche on 9 November 2010. 3sat "Kulturzeit": Kritik an Grosser. Zentralrat lehnt Politologen als Redner ab.  German.
Author Alfred Grosser is controversial choice for Kristallnacht speech, Deutsche Welle (interview 8 November 2010, retrieved 13 November 2010). English.

Reviews
über das Buch Deutschland in Europa, 
Michael Hereth Alfred Grosser at his best über das Buch Wie anders ist Frankreich.Ursula Homann Hinwendung zur Welt Warum Alfred Grosser nicht an Gott glaubt über das Buch Die Früchte ihres Baumes. Ein atheistischer Blick auf die Christen.References

External links

Richtig denken, das heißt: gerecht denken Artikel at his 80th birthday in Die Welt, 1 February 2005.
Presentation in Stuttgart city hall 1 June 2005.
Talk with Alfred Grosser 18 June 2008 in Paris.
Before the Kristallnacht commemory of 9 November 2010 in Frankfurt Die Welt: Ist die Meinungsfreiheit für Israelkritiker wirklich bedroht?'' 4 November 2010. Discussion about Grosser's support for Martin Walser and the "Moralkeule" (moral club). Includes precise quotes.

German political scientists
German essayists
Grand Crosses with Star and Sash of the Order of Merit of the Federal Republic of Germany
Grand Croix of the Légion d'honneur
Grand Cross of the Ordre national du Mérite
Commandeurs of the Ordre des Arts et des Lettres
French political scientists
Jewish emigrants from Nazi Germany to France
1925 births
Living people
French essayists
Winners of the Prix Broquette-Gonin (literature)
French male essayists
German male essayists